The parachuting frog (Nyctimystes pterodactyla), or pale-eyed parachuting tree frog, is a species of frog found in New Guinea.  It is in the Nyctimystes gramineus complex with the Pinocchio frog and montane Pinocchio frog.

The frog uses its webbed toes to steer when it jumps out of trees, like a human in a parachute. As of 2019, scientists had only seen the parachuting frog once. They found it in the Muller mountain range, 515 meters above sea level.

The scientists used DNA barcoding to examine the parachuting frog and other species found nearby, the Pinocchio frog and montane Pinocchio frog.

The scientific name of this frog, pterodactyla, means "wings on its fingers" and comes from Latin.

References

Amphibians of New Guinea
Litoria
Amphibians described in 2019